Edward Howard, 8th Earl of Suffolk (1672 - 22 Jun 1731) was an English peer.

Edward Howard was the second son of Henry Howard, 5th Earl of Suffolk, and his wife Mary Stewart. He was educated at Magdalene College, Cambridge. He succeeded his nephew Charles Howard, 7th Earl of Suffolk in 1722.

He was succeeded by his younger brother Charles Howard, 9th Earl of Suffolk.

References

 Charles Mosley (ed.), Burke's Peerage, Baronetage & Knightage, 107th Edition, Wilmington, Delaware, 2003, vol III, pp. 3814–3817, 

1672 births
1731 deaths
Alumni of Magdalene College, Cambridge
Edward
Edward Howard, 8th Earl of Suffolk